Cy Marshall (April 17, 1902 in Kansas City, Missouri – December 20, 1974 in Volusia, Florida) was an American racecar driver. Marshall was seriously injured and his riding mechanic, brother Paul Marshall, was killed in the 1930 Indy 500. He returned to the race in 1947. The 17 years between starts was a record he shared with Roland Free, who also competed in only the 1930 and 1947 races, until it was broken by Jacques Villeneuve, who competed in the 2014 race after having last competed in the 1995 race.  Marshall also failed to qualify for the 1950 race.

Cy Marshall is survived by three children: Cy Marshall, Jr., Gary Marshall, and Carolyn Marshall. Cy Marshall, Jr. and Gary Marshall reside in Florida; Carolyn Marshall resides in Indiana.

Indianapolis 500 results

References

1902 births
1974 deaths
Indianapolis 500 drivers
Sportspeople from Kansas City, Missouri
Racing drivers from Missouri
Racing drivers from Kansas City, Missouri